Sacra Mensa is a mesa in the Lunae Palus quadrangle of Mars, located between the northern and southern channels of the Kasei Valles. Located roughly 66.5° west longitude and 24.6° north latitude, the mesa is a highland between two deep outflow valleys. The mesa is located just west of the Sharonov impact crater.

References

External links
Kasei Valles outflow channel system - European Space Agency
Kasei Valles mosaic (ESA)

Lunae Palus quadrangle
Mensae on Mars